Gretl Theimer (27 November 1910 – 14 May 1972) was an Austrian actress.

Theimer was born in Vienna, Austria and died in Munich, Germany at age 61.

Selected filmography
 Two Hearts in Waltz Time (1930)
 Oh Those Glorious Old Student Days (1930)
 Three Days Confined to Barracks (1930)
 His Highness Love (1931)
 Schubert's Dream of Spring (1931)
 When the Soldiers (1931)
 Her Majesty the Barmaid (1931)
 Everyone Asks for Erika (1931)
 Victoria and Her Hussar (1931)
 Holzapfel Knows Everything (1932)
 His Majesty's Adjutant (1932)
 The Champion Shot (1932)
 Viennese Waltz (1932)
 The Secret of Johann Orth (1932)
 The Happiness of Grinzing (1933)
 Our Emperor (1933)
 Just Once a Great Lady (1934)
 The Fight with the Dragon (1935)
 Fräulein Veronika (1936)
 Such Great Foolishness (1937)
 The Vagabonds (1937)
 Dance on the Volcano (1938)
 Immortal Waltz (1939)
 Falstaff in Vienna (1940)
 The Prince of Pappenheim (1952)
 The Trapp Family (1956)
 The Beautiful Master (1956)
 Marriages Forbidden (1957)
 Voyage to Italy, Complete with Love (1958)

External links

1910 births
1972 deaths
Austrian film actresses
Actresses from Vienna
20th-century Austrian actresses